Lanterman House is a bungalow-style historic house museum in La Cañada Flintridge, California on the National Register of Historic Places.  The house was commissioned by Dr. Roy Lanterman in 1915 and was built by A. L. Haley (b. 1865), who was a prominent builder of both residences and commercial buildings in the Los Angeles area.

Lanterman, who had treated victims of the 1906 San Francisco earthquake and fire, insisted that the foundation, floors and walls of his house be built from reinforced concrete, and Haley interpreted the aesthetics of Craftsman-style wood-built bungalows in the new material. The house retains much of its original furniture and finishes, including a grand ballroom that occupies the entire second floor, and Dr. Lanterman's consulting rooms in the basement.

The property was opened as a museum in 1993 and is managed by the Lanterman Foundation.   It was placed on the National Register of Historic Places in 1994.  It is home to the Lanterman House Archives, which contains family materials as well as documents and photographs from the defunct La Cañada Flintridge Historical Society.

The Lanterman House is open for tours most Tuesday and Thursday afternoons from 1 p.m. - 4 p.m. and the first and third Sundays of each month from 1 p.m. - 4 p.m. The Lanterman House History Center and Archive is available for public research by appointment. It is recommended that you call before visiting.

References

External links
 Lanterman Foundation website

Houses in Los Angeles County, California
Historic house museums in California
Museums in Los Angeles County, California
La Cañada Flintridge, California
Houses on the National Register of Historic Places in California
Buildings and structures on the National Register of Historic Places in Los Angeles County, California
Houses completed in 1915
Bungalow architecture in California